Nicetas (Russ. Никита Nikita, Ukrain. Микита, from Greek Νικήτας Niketas) is a Christian martyr of the 4th century, venerated particularly in the Russian Orthodox Church. His feastday is 15 September.

Life
Nicetas, a Gothic soldier, lived in the Danube region at the margins of the Byzantine Empire. Presumably, he received his Greek name on the occasion of his baptism by the Gothic bishop Theophilus, a participant in the First Ecumenical Council. Pagan Goths began to oppose the spread of Christianity, which resulted in internecine strife. Nicetas fought in the Gothic civil war between the pagan Athanaric and the Christian Fritigern.

After the defeat of Athanaric and after the invention of Gothic alphabets by Ulfilas, Nicetas worked intensely among the Goths.  He was condemned to the stake in 372. According to his Passio, the devil, shaped as an angel, induced Nicetas to sacrifice to the pagan gods for saving his life; Nicetas, however, put him to flight by means of prayer and assisted by archangel Michael. His body was buried in Cilicia, and later transferred to Constantinople.

In Greece, Russia, Ukraine, Serbia, and Cyprus there are several churches and monasteries named after St Nicetas. See Church of Saint Nicetas.

St Nicetas is prayed to for the preservation of children from birth defects.

The veneration of this saint in the medieval period gave rise to the Slavic forms of his name: Nikita, Mykyta and Mikita.

See also
Gothic persecution of Christians
Sabbas the Goth

References

External links 

Story and legend (German)

4th-century Christian martyrs
4th-century Christian saints
4th-century Romans
4th-century Gothic people
Year of birth unknown